Jeanne-Catherine Gaussem (1711–1767), was a French stage actress.

She was engaged at the Comédie-Française in 1731.

She became a Sociétaires of the Comédie-Française in 1731.

She retired in 1763.

References

External links 
  Jeanne-Catherine Gaussem, Comédie-Française

1711 births
1767 deaths
18th-century French actresses
French stage actresses